Benjamin Alec Lewis (1912-2003) was the Archdeacon of St Davids from 1970 to 1982.

Lewis was born in 1912 and educated at St David's College, Lampeter. He was ordained deacon in 1937, and priest in 1938.  After curacies at Cardigan and Ammanford, he was Bishop's messenger to the Bishop of St David's, David Prosser. He held incumbencies in Llanelly and Hubberston.

References

1912 births
Alumni of the University of Wales, Lampeter
Archdeacons of St Davids
Church in Wales archdeacons
20th-century Welsh Anglican priests
Year of death missing